Girls' Generation II: -Girls & Peace- 2nd Japan Tour was the second Japanese concert tour by South Korean girl group Girls' Generation to promote their second Japanese album, Girls & Peace.

History
It was announced on August 31, 2012, that Girls' Generation will embark on their second nationwide Japan tour starting in February 2013, with an initial total of 20 stops in support of their second Japanese studio album, Girls & Peace. On the same day, it was revealed that the fans could start applying for tickets on September 5, 2012. The tour will cover Nagoya, Osaka, Fukuoka, Saitama, Niigata, Hiroshima & Kobe.

According to an announcement made by their agency, SM Entertainment, Girls' Generation wrapped up their second arena tour successfully in Japan, where the group started the tour on February 9. Girls' Generation II -Girls&Peace- Japan 2nd Tour was performed 20 times in 7 different cities, including Kobe, Saitama, and Niigata and gathered about 200,000 fans, which was the largest tour among Korean girl groups. They finished the last performances on April 20 and 21 at the Central Arena in Osaka, performing 27 songs including "Genie", "Gee", "Girls&Peace", "Flower Power", "I Got a Boy", and "Dancing Queen".

Live broadcasts
Japanese broadcaster WOWOW filmed the group's April 4 and 5, 2013, shows at the Saitama Super Arena. The show aired on WOWOW's music channel "WOWOW Live" on June 16 at 9PM JST. A television special entitled "Girls' Generation Arena Tour Special~Before Broadcast~", aired prior to the concert on June 1, 2013.

Set list

Main Set

 "Flower Power"
 "Animal"
 "Boomerang"
 "The Boys" 
 "I Got a Boy"
 "Say Yes"
 "Dancing Queen"

 "Mr. Taxi"  
 "T.O.P."
 "Bad Girl"

 "Paparazzi"
 "Run Devil Run" 
 "Reflection"

 "Time Machine"
 "All My Love Is for You"

 "I'm A Diamond"
 "Express 999"
 "Genie" 
 "The Great Escape"  / "Can't Take My Eyes Off You"

 "My J"
 "Kissing You" / "Way to Go"
 "Gee" 
 "Not Alone"
Encore
 "Beep Beep"
 "Oh!" 
 "Stay Girls"
 "Girls & Peace"
Double Encore
 "Gee" 1

1 Double encore was only performed at Osaka, April 21, 2013, as the last concert of the tour.

Tour dates

DVD

Girls & Peace: 2nd Japan Tour is the eighth DVD and Blu-ray release from South Korean girl group Girls' Generation. It was released on September 18, 2013, in Japan.

History
The DVD and Blu-ray features their second nationwide tour, visiting eight venues for a total of 20 shows. There will be four different versions: a DVD and Blu-ray version, both with a regular and limited edition. The limited editions will come with special footage content, a 44-page photobook pamphlet, special T-shirt,  dance versions of several music videos and a tour documentary.

Track list

Chart performance
According to Tower Record's pre-order charts, the limited edition Blu-ray ranked second and the limited edition DVD ranked third. Girls' Generation's Girls & Peace: 2nd Japan Tour which was released on September 18 took the no.1 spot on Oricon Daily DVD  and it also ranked 3rd on Oricon Daily Blu-ray Chart. The DVD managed to rank 2nd at Oricon Daily DVD Music Chart. One week after the release, the DVD sold 32,000 copies while the Blu-ray sold 21,000 copies. The DVD debuted at rank number 1 on the Oricon Weekly DVD Chart.

Charts

Sales and certifications

Release history

References

Girls' Generation concert tours
2013 concert tours
Girls' Generation video albums
Concert tours of Japan
2013 in Japanese music